The Huxtable Ranch Ranch Headquarters District, also known as White Creek Ranch, comprises a complex of ranch structures in Converse County, Wyoming. It was part of a dispersed community known as Boxelder, established by settlers in the 1880s. The ranch was established in 1893 by Charles Smith who built a one-room and later a three-room cabin on the property, as well as a barn. Three years later he sold the homestead to Willard Heber White. White and his wife lived on the ranch until 1928 when they moved to Douglas. On White's death in 1929, the ranch was purchased by Lloyd Huxtable and Charlie Olin. Lloyd and Olin built the present ranch house for Charlie and his wife Najima, Olin's sister, from 1933 to 1935. The Huxtables operated the ranch until his death at 86 in 1976. Huxtable served as a Converse County Commissioner from 1948 to 1956.

Description
Structures on the ranch include the main ranch house, a garage, a house trailer, a stock shed, a laundry house/office, a shop and barns for chickens, horses and cows. The stock shed was built in the early 1940s. The wood frame shop was built on a foundation dated to 1944. The horse and cow barns are frame structures dating to Willard White's ownership.

The Huxtable Ranch Headquarters District was listed on the National Register of Historic Places in on April 17, 2011.

References

External links
 Huxtable Ranch Headquarters District at the Wyoming State Historic Preservation Office
 Huxtable Ranch at wyohistoty.org

National Register of Historic Places in Converse County, Wyoming
Ranches on the National Register of Historic Places in Wyoming
Historic districts on the National Register of Historic Places in Wyoming